Rogério de Assis Silva Coutinho or simply Rogerinho (born March 20, 1987 in Bacabal), is a Brazilian professional footballer who plays for Hatta as an attacking midfielder.

Club career

Early life
Rogerinho made his professional debut in 3-3 draw away to J. Malucelli on January 14, 2007, scoring his first professional goal in a 3-3 draw away to Londrina on February 1, 2007 in the Campeonato Paranaense.

He was sent off in a 2-1 defeat away at Paranavaí on February 7, 2007, also in the Campeonato Paranaense.

Kuwait SC
Rogerinho transferred to Kuwait League champions Al-Kuwait in September 2008. On 21 May 2009, he won the Kuwaiti Emir Cup with Kuwait Sports Club after defeating Al Arabi. Furthermore, he won 3 AFC Cups with Kuwait Sports Club, as well as the Kuwait Crown Prince Cup 2 years in a row (2010, 2011), and the Kuwait Federation Cup in 2010 and 2012. He won the best player award in 2012 due to his performance in the 2012 AFC Cup. In 2012, Rogerinho also won AFC Award for best foreign player of the year. He won 12 titles with Kuwait Sports Club, making him the most successful player in Kuwait and in Asia.

Al Shabab FC
In July 2014, he joined Al-Shabab on a 1-year loan deal. On 7 August 2014, he won Saudi Super Cup title with Al-Shabab after defeating Al Nassr FC in a penalty shootout. On 19 December 2014, he left the team after recording 5 goals and 4 assists in 16 appearances for the club.

Hatta
On 27 July 2022, Rogerinho joined UAE side Hatta.

Club Carrer Statistics
As of 6 February 2023

Honours
Al-Kuwait
VIVA Premier League: 2012–13,  2014–15
Kuwait Emir Cup: 2009, 2014
Kuwait Crown Prince Cup: 2010, 2011
Kuwait Federation Cup: 2010, 2011-12, 2014–15 
Kuwait Super Cup: 2010,  2015
AFC Cup: 2009, 2012, 2013

Al-Shabab
Saudi Super Cup: 2014

Individual
AFC Foreign Player of the Year: 2012

References

External links
 furacao.com
Rogerinho at ZeroZero

1987 births
Living people
Brazilian footballers
Brazilian expatriate footballers
Club Athletico Paranaense players
Fortaleza Esporte Clube players
Kuwait SC players
Al-Shabab FC (Riyadh) players
Al-Wasl F.C. players
Al-Faisaly FC players
Ettifaq FC players
Khaleej FC players
Al-Jabalain FC players
Hatta Club players
Saudi Professional League players
UAE Pro League players
Saudi First Division League players
UAE First Division League players
Expatriate footballers in Kuwait
Expatriate footballers in Saudi Arabia
Brazilian expatriate sportspeople in Saudi Arabia
Expatriate footballers in the United Arab Emirates
Brazilian expatriate sportspeople in Kuwait
Association football midfielders
Sportspeople from Maranhão
AFC Cup winning players
Kuwait Premier League players